Mendoza is a Basque surname, also occurring as a place name.

The name Mendoza means "cold mountain", derived from the Basque words mendi (mountain) and (h)otz (cold) + definite article '-a' (Mendoza being mendi+(h)otza). The original Basque form with an affricate sibilant (/ts/, Basque spelling /tz/) evolved in Spanish to the current form.

History
 Records of the Mendoza family can be traced back to the Middle Ages in Alava, in the Basque Country, Spain. It is believed that the family descends from the ancient Lords of Llodio (Alava), where the original patronymic house would have been. The Mendozas belonged to the local nobility, and branched out into different family lines early on. 

The most distinguished branch of the family originated in what nowadays is known as the village of Mendoza, near Vitoria-Gasteiz, Basque Country; the village takes its name after the family. A certain scion of this family, Iñigo Lopez de Mendoza, distinguished himself in the Battle of Las Navas de Tolosa (1218), where he probably served under the Navarrese banner. He was responsible for building the ancestral home of the family, the Tower of Mendoza, which still stands. This branch of the family entered the service of the Kingdom of Castile during the reign of Alfonso XI (1312-1350), and took active part in the Reconquista, where they quickly acquired extensive land holdings in Castile and southern Spain through military and political service. The members of the House of Mendoza intermarried extensively with the Castilian nobility, and the family has many descendants nowadays, with numerous nobility titles attached to it. The line of the Dukes of the Infantado formed one of the main branches of the family. 

Another branch of the family was based in Laudio, 50km northwest from Vitoria-Gasteiz. The family got involved in the medieval bloody War of the Clans. Finally, in Erandio, a baserri exists under the same name. Its original name "mendotza" developed to "mendontze" in the 1890s, "mendoche" in the 1920s, "mendotxe" in the 1980s to the restored original of "mendotza" being the current. The surname spread quickly through Castile during the Middle Ages. With the discovery of America, many of its members would emigrate to the Americas, where the surname is common.

Notable people with the surname

Business
 Eugenio Mendoza, Venezuelan businessman
 Lorenzo Mendoza, Venezuelan businessman
 Tom Mendoza, Vice Chairman of NetApp, Inc. and namesake of Notre Dame's business school

Arts, Entertainment and Media
 Íñigo López de Mendoza, 1st Marquess of Santillana, Castilian statesman and poet.
 Amalia Mendoza, a Mexican singer
 Brillante Mendoza, a Filipino film director
 Dayana Mendoza, a Venezuelan actress, model who won Miss Universe 2008.
 Eduardo Mendoza Garriga, a Spanish novelist
 Hazel Ann Mendoza, a Filipina actress
 Javier Mendoza (boxer), Mexican professional boxer
 June Mendoza, portrait painter
 Kerry-Anne Mendoza, editor of The Canary
 Linda Mendoza, an American film and television director
 Lydia Mendoza, a Tex-Mex singer and interpreter of "corridos"
 Maine Mendoza, a Filipina actress
 Marco Mendoza, bass player
 Margot Rojas Mendoza (1903 – 1996), Cuban pianist and teacher 
 Mark Mendoza, bass player
 Natalie Mendoza, a Hong Kong-born Australian actress and musician
 Philip Mendoza, a British artist and cartoonist 
 Rebecca Jackson Mendoza, an Australian actress, singer and dancer
 Thristan Mendoza, a Filipino musician
 Mario Mendoza Zambrano, a Colombian Writer
 Vince Mendoza, an American jazz composer and arranger

Fiction 

 Aristotle "Ari" Mendoza, main character from the book "Aristotle and Dante Discover the Secrets of the Universe", written by Benjamin Alire Sáenz
 Armando Mendoza Sáenz, coprotagonist of the Colombian Telenovela Yo soy Betty, la fea.
 Jason Mendoza, a main character in the show The Good Place.
 Maria Mendoza, an alternate Peruvian Wonder Woman created by Stan Lee.
 Mendoza, a recurring gag character in The Simpsons
 Mendoza, fictional character of the "Company" books by Kage Baker
 Rodrigo Mendoza, fictional character of the movie The Mission

Military 

 Íñigo López de Mendoza y Quiñones, Castilian general instrumental in the final stages of the Reconquista
 Diego Hurtado de Mendoza, Castilian nobleman
 César Mendoza, member of Government Junta of Chile (1973) as chief of Carabineros de Chile
 Pedro de Mendoza, conquistador
 Bernardino de Mendoza, Captain General

Politics and government 

 Diego Hurtado de Mendoza, 1st Duke of the Infantado, Spanish nobleman 
 Antonio de Mendoza, first Viceroy of New Spain
 Bernardino de Mendoza, Spanish statesman and ambassador
 Carlos Antonio Mendoza, acting President of Panama
 César Mendoza, Chilean soldier
 Cristóbal Mendoza, First President of Venezuela
 Eduardo Mendoza Goiticoa, a Venezuelan cabinet minister and scientist
 Eugenio Mendoza, a Venezuelan cabinet minister and industrial
 García Hurtado de Mendoza, a Spanish governor of Chile
 Inés Mendoza, wife of Puerto Rico Governor Luis Muñoz Marín
 Íñigo López de Mendoza, 1st Marquess of Santillana, Castilian statesman  
 Juan González de Mendoza, Spanish minister and historian
 Leandro Mendoza, Philippine Secretary of Transportation and Communications
 Pedro González de Mendoza, Spanish cardinal and statesman
 Susana Mendoza, Chicago, Illinois politician
 Victoria Muñoz Mendoza, Puerto Rico politician

Religion 

 Pedro González de Mendoza, Spanish cardinal and statesman

Royalty 

Ana de Mendoza y de la Cerda, Spanish aristocrat
Beatriz Fajardo de Mendoza y de Guzmán, Baroness of Polop and Benidorm

Science 

 Josef de Mendoza y Ríos, (1761–1816) Spanish astronomer and mathematician

Sport
Alvin Mendoza, Mexican football (soccer) player
Ana Mendoza, Mexican breaststroke swimmer
Carlos Mendoza (baseball coach), Venezuelan baseball coach
Carlos Mendoza (outfielder), baseball player
Daniel Mendoza, English boxer
Elías Mendoza Habersperger
Gabriel Mendoza, Chilean football (soccer) player
Jessica Mendoza, American softball player
Jesús Mendoza, Mexican football player
Jonny Mendoza, Venezuelan boxer
Luis Mendoza Benedetto, Venezuelan footballer
Luis Mendoza, baseball player
Luis Angel Mendoza, Mexican football player
Mario Mendoza, baseball player
Michael Mendoza, American football player
Mike Mendoza, baseball player
Ramiro Mendoza, baseball player
Raul Mendoza, professional wrestler
Rigoberto Mendoza (disambiguation), several people
Ruben Mendoza (American football), American football

See also
Mendonça, Portuguese variant

References

Basque-language surnames
Surnames of Spanish origin
Surnames of Filipino origin